Greg Van Avermaet (born 17 May 1985) is a Belgian professional cyclist, who currently rides for UCI WorldTeam . Considered one of the most versatile riders of modern cycling, Van Avermaet is a specialist of the classic cycle races, but has also won stages and the general classification in stage races, particularly when run on a hilly terrain, such as the 2016 Tirreno–Adriatico, and the 2018 Tour de Yorkshire. His strong sprint finish enables him to win sprints of small lead groups, but he has also won races after solo breakaways.

He won the men's individual road race event at the 2016 Summer Olympics, and has won other one-day races such as Paris–Roubaix, Gent–Wevelgem and E3 Harelbeke in 2017, the 2016 GP de Montréal and Omloop Het Nieuwsblad in 2016 and 2017. In the Grand Tours, Van Avermaet has taken two individual stage wins in the Tour de France, and worn the Yellow Jersey for eleven days during the 2016 and 2018 Tours and won the points classification in the Vuelta a España, with one stage win in the Vuelta a España. Van Avermaet was also the overall winner of the 2017 UCI World Tour.

Career

Early life and amateur career
Greg Van Avermaet was born into a cycling family; both his father and grandfather were professional cyclists. He was named after American cyclist Greg LeMond since his father "was a fan". He started bike racing at the age of 19, having previously played football as a goalkeeper for SK Beveren. He is a former brother-in-law of Glenn D'Hollander, also a former professional cyclist. In 2006, at 21, he became Belgian amateur champion on the  team.

2007–2010: Silence/Omega Pharma–Lotto

2007
In 2007 he signed his first professional contract for the  UCI ProTeam and won four races in his maiden year. In the Tour of Qatar, his first professional race for his new team, he won stage 5 in the sprint of a breakaway group, followed by a number of good finishes in smaller races. His results earned him a place in the line-up for the Tour of Flanders and Paris–Roubaix – his best result being 29th in Roubaix. A few months later he won a stage in the Tour de Wallonie, as well as the prestigious one-day race Rund um die Hainleite in Germany and the Memorial Rik Van Steenbergen in Belgium. He entered his first world championships, in Stuttgart, finishing 63rd in the road race.

2008
Van Avermaet's breakthrough year was 2008. He finished third in E3 Harelbeke after being in a breakaway, and eighth in his second Tour of Flanders. In May, he won the Ardennes stage in the Tour of Belgium, but lost the leader's jersey the next day to Stijn Devolder and finished second overall. Later, he was fourth in the Belgian National Road Race Championships.

In summer he won stages in the Tour de Wallonie and the Tour de l'Ain, as well as seventh place in the GP Ouest-France in Plouay, before making his debut in a grand tour, the Vuelta a España. He made a remarkable debut, with a victory on stage 9 of the race, when he outsprinted ten other breakaway companions in Sabiñánigo, ahead of Davide Rebellin. Following several other top-10 finishes, he also won the Vuelta's final points classification ahead of Alberto Contador and Alejandro Valverde. One week later, he finished 17th in the World Road Race Championships in Varese. At the end of 2008, he was awarded the Flandrien of the Year award by Belgian journalists.

2009
2009 proved to be a difficult year, with one win, the Heistse Pijl, and several near-wins. He made his first appearance in the Tour de France, with fourth and seventh places in the latter stages as best results. He finished the Tour de France in 89th place overall.

2010
In 2010 he could not claim a win and did not make the line-up for the Tour de France. He placed 49th in his second Vuelta a España, before competing in the World Championships in Australia. He finished fifth in the road race in Geelong, in a sprint won by Thor Hushovd. At the end of the season he stated he would leave his  team.

2011: Transfer to BMC and Paris–Tours victory

In 2011 he joined . After starting his season in the Tour of Qatar, he ran a remarkable campaign in the spring classics, in which he was one of the most attacking riders. Ninth place in Milan–San Remo and seventh in Liège–Bastogne–Liège were his best results. After the spring classics, he finished second in the Tour of Belgium.

In summer, he claimed his first victories for his new team. He won a stage and the points classification in the Tour of Austria, and he won the overall classification and final stage in the Tour de Wallonie. He entered the Eneco Tour and Vuelta a España in which he gained several top-20 stage results. In October he claimed his first classic victory, after beating Marco Marcato in a two-man sprint in Paris–Tours. He finished the season with a second place in the Giro del Piemonte and twelfth in the Tour of Lombardy.

2012–2014: Mister Almost
2012
In the spring of 2012 Van Avermaet became a front-runner in the classics with several strong performances. Early in the season he was fifth in both Omloop Het Nieuwsblad and Strade Bianche, before focusing on the cobbled classics. He finished fourth in the Tour of Flanders, where he won the sprint at the finish in Oudenaarde 40 seconds behind the leading breakaway.

In summer, he skipped the Tour de France again and came close to winning his first World Tour race in the Grand Prix de Québec. He attacked on the final Côte de la Montagne, but was joined by Simon Gerrans, who beat him in a two-man sprint. He was second again five days later in the Grand Prix de Wallonie, before competing in the World Road Race Championships in Valkenburg, in the Netherlands. He placed 25th in the race, after playing a helping role for his teammate Philippe Gilbert, who won the world title. He ended his season with eighth place in the Giro del Piemonte and sixth in Paris–Tours.

2013

In 2013, Van Avermaet garnered several top-10 finishes in the spring classics. He finished fifth in Omloop Het Nieuwsblad, sixth in Strade Bianche, third in Gent–Wevelgem, seventh in the Tour of Flanders, fourth in Paris–Roubaix and sixth in Brabantse Pijl, but again failed to claim a single win.

Later in the year, he had a strong summer campaign, starting with two stage wins and the overall classification in the Tour de Wallonie, as well the first stage of the Tour of Utah and several top-5 stage finishes in the USA Pro Cycling Challenge. In the Laurentian Classics in Canada, he finished third in the Grand Prix de Québec and fourth in the Grand Prix de Montréal. Back in Europe, he finished 23rd in the World Road Race Championships in Florence and 19th in the Giro di Lombardia. At the end of 2013, with four victories, he won his second Flandrien of the Year award.

2014

In 2014, Van Avermaet ran another strong spring campaign but again failed to win a classic race. He finished second in Omloop Het Nieuwsblad and the Tour of Flanders, losing both races in the sprint, to Ian Stannard and Fabian Cancellara respectively. In the summer, he entered the Tour de France, in which he helped his leader Tejay van Garderen to fifth place in the general classification and finished 38th himself.

Later in the campaign, Van Avermaet took eighth place in the Clásica San Sebastián and fifth overall in the Eneco Tour, as well as one stage win. He finished fifth in the GP de Quebec – his third consecutive top-5 finish in Quebec – and seventh in the GP de Montréal. In September, Van Avermaet won the 1.HC-ranked Grand Prix de Wallonie; he was part of a four-strong breakaway and, with the peloton on their heels, Van Avermaet attacked in the final uphill bends to claim his second win of the season. Three days later, he won the GP Impanis-Van Petegem, earning him the leadership in the Belgian line-up for the World championships in Ponferrada, Spain. He was in the winning breakaway of the road race together with his  teammate and fellow Belgian Philippe Gilbert, but was unable to answer an ultimate attack from Michał Kwiatkowski and finished fifth. He ended the season with 39th place in Paris–Tours.

At the end of 2014 he earned his third Flandrien of the year award as best Belgian rider of the year.

2015: Classics specialist and Tour de France stage win

In 2015, Van Avermaet started his season traditionally in the Middle-Eastern Tour of Qatar and Tour of Oman races, where he placed third on two stages. After another top-ten finish in Omloop Het Nieuwsblad, he finished second in Strade Bianche behind Zdeněk Štybar. He claimed his first victory of the season on Stage 3 of Tirreno–Adriatico in an uphill-sprint finish, besting Peter Sagan and Štybar. Coming into the cobbled classics, he crashed hard in E3 Harelbeke, nearly jeopardizing the April classics. In April, Van Avermaet finished third in the Tour of Flanders after a strong performance. He dropped Sagan in the final kilometers of the race while closing in on Alexander Kristoff, the eventual winner, and Niki Terpstra. A week later, he earned another prestigious podium finish in Paris–Roubaix, finishing third in a seven-man sprint behind John Degenkolb and Štybar. He ended his classics campaign with fifth place in the Amstel Gold Race, despite being under investigation for doping, at that time.

In May, in his build-up to the Tour de France, Van Avermaet won both the final stage and the overall classification in the Tour of Belgium. He took part in the Tour de Suisse, finishing sixth on the Prologue and third in stage 4. He entered the Tour de France, in which he helped the  win the team time trial on Stage 9. On 17 July 2015, he won stage 13, his first individual Tour de France stage win. He outsprinted the green jersey wearer Peter Sagan, and fellow Belgian Jan Bakelants on an uphill finish in Rodez. He withdrew from the race three days later to witness the birth of his first daughter.

Less than two weeks later, on 1 August 2015, Van Avermaet looked on his way to victory in the Clásica de San Sebastián, when he was hit from behind by one of the motorbikes providing television coverage just before the top of the final climb. Suffering a broken bike frame, he was unable to finish and saw Adam Yates win the race. In the aftermath of the incident, his  claimed the crash had cost him victory and threatened legal action over "millions of dollars in lost publicity". A few days later he entered the Eneco Tour and finished second overall, trailing winner Tim Wellens by a minute.

In his preparation for the world championships he placed fifth in the Vattenfall Cyclassics in Hamburg and entered the Laurentian Classics in Canada. Considered a favourite in the world road race title in Richmond, he attacked on Libby Hill, the final climb of the race, but was overtaken by Peter Sagan and narrowly failed to stay in his wheel. His attempts to catch Sagan failed as his chase companion Edvald Boasson Hagen was not allowed to work in the pursuit and both were caught by the returning peloton in the final kilometer. Van Avermaet finished 23rd. His last race of the season was Paris–Tours, where he was in the winning three-man breakaway and the favourite to win the sprint, when he punctured just one kilometer from the line and finished third. At the end of the year, Van Avermaet was awarded both the Crystal Bicycle and Flandrien of the Year awards as best Belgian cyclist of the year, and was second in the Belgian Sportsman of the year poll behind footballer Kevin De Bruyne.

2016: Olympic champion

In 2016 he opened the season with numerous top-5 placings in the Tour of Qatar and Tour of Oman. In late February, he won Omloop Het Nieuwsblad, after beating Peter Sagan in a five-man sprint in Ghent. He finished sixth in Strade Bianche, before entering Tirreno–Adriatico, where he was on the winning team of the opening team time trial. After the cancellation of Tirreno's queen stage, he won the sixth stage in a sprint with Sagan, and successfully defended his lead in the final time trial, by one second over Sagan – his first overall win in a World Tour stage race. The victory pushed Van Avermaet to the top of the UCI World Ranking for one week. Following Tirreno–Adriatico, he finished fifth in Milan–San Remo but crashed and broke his collarbone in the Tour of Flanders.

After his return from injury in May, he competed in the Tour of California and the Critérium du Dauphiné, before placing third in the Belgian National Road Race Championships behind Philippe Gilbert and Tim Wellens. In July he entered the Tour de France: he won stage 5 to Le Lioran, his second Tour de France stage win, after a long breakaway and having completed the final  solo. He also moved into the yellow jersey, which he held for three days, and finished 44th overall. Six days after the Tour de France, he finished fifth in the Clásica de San Sebastián in Spain.

On 6 August 2016, Van Avermaet won the men's individual road race at the Summer Olympics in Rio de Janeiro. He initially joined a six-man breakaway on the first of three passes of the  Vista Chinesa Circuit loop, and managed to stay in contact with several climbing specialists on the next ascents. Van Avermaet was distanced by Vincenzo Nibali, Sergio Henao and Rafał Majka on the final climb, but after Nibali and Henao crashed out of the race on the final descent, Van Avermaet tandemed with Jakob Fuglsang to catch Majka on the run-in to the finish. Van Avermaet won the three-man sprint on Copacabana Beach before Fuglsang and Majka to claim the Olympic gold medal.

Later in the season he finished second in the Grand Prix de Québec behind Peter Sagan; he won the Grand Prix de Montréal ahead of Sagan; ended fourth overall in the Eneco Tour; as well as fourth in Binche–Chimay–Binche. He ended the season with a 10th place at the World Road Race Championships in Qatar.

2017: King of the spring classics and world number one
After suffering an ankle fracture during the winter, Van Avermaet started his 2017 campaign in February at the Tour of the Valencian Community, in which his  won the opening team time trial. Later in February he rode the Tour of Oman, before competing in the opening weekend of Belgian races. He won his second consecutive Omloop Het Nieuwsblad, again after beating Peter Sagan in a three-man sprint in Ghent; and finished seventh in Kuurne–Brussels–Kuurne the next day.

As usual, he proceeded his spring campaign in the Italian races Strade Bianche, in which he finished second behind Michał Kwiatkowski; Tirreno–Adriatico, in which his  won the team time trial and he moved into the race lead for one day; and was 21st in Milan–San Remo. On 24 March, Van Avermaet won E3 Harelbeke in a three-man sprint with Philippe Gilbert and Oliver Naesen. Two days later, he continued his winning streak with victory in Gent–Wevelgem in a two-man sprint against Jens Keukeleire. The pairing had broken away from a select group of riders on the run-in towards Wevelgem. Van Avermaet became the second rider to win Omloop Het Nieuwsblad, E3 Harelbeke and Gent–Wevelgem in the same season, after Jan Raas in 1981, and moved into the lead of the UCI World Tour.

Still seeking his first win in a monument classic, he was favourite for the Tour of Flanders, but crashed on the final ascent of Oude Kwaremont together with Peter Sagan as they were chasing Philippe Gilbert. Halted in his pursuit, he finished second behind his former teammate Gilbert. On 9 April 2017, Van Avermaet won Paris–Roubaix, claiming his first career monument victory. He broke away with five others on the cobbled sector of Templeuve-en-Pévèle in pursuit of his teammate Daniel Oss. After the sector of Carrefour de l'Arbre, only Zdeněk Štybar and Sebastian Langeveld were with him, and Van Avermaet outsprinted his companions for the win on the Roubaix Velodrome. He ended his spring campaign with a 12th place in the Amstel Gold Race and 11th in Liège–Bastogne–Liège.

Building up towards the Tour de France, he won two stages and the general classification at the Tour of Luxembourg, followed by 48th place overall at the Tour de Suisse. He failed to win a stage at the Tour de France, with a second-place finish on stage 14 to Rodez as best stage result. After the Tour de France, he was eighth in the Clásica San Sebastián, fourth overall in the Binckbank Tour and tenth in the Bretagne Classic. In September, he finished second at the Grand Prix de Québec, seventh at the Grand Prix de Montréal and was sixth in the World Road Race Championships in Bergen, Norway. He ended the year as world number one on both the UCI World Ranking and UCI World Tour, a place he held since April 2017.

2018: One week in the yellow jersey

As world number one, Van Avermaet kicked off the 2018 season with 20th place overall in the Tour of Valencia and 16th overall in the Tour of Oman, in which he won the third stage in a group sprint on the Wadi Dayqah Dam. He proceeded with 50th place in Omloop Het Nieuwsblad, 34th in Strade Bianche, 20th overall in Tirreno–Adriatico, and 17th in Milan–San Remo. In the cobbled classics of Belgium and France, Van Avermaet was at the front in every race but failed to secure a win, finishing third in E3 Harelbeke, 14th in Gent–Wevelgem, and eighth in Dwars door Vlaanderen. In the Tour of Flanders he accelerated on the Taaienberg, at 38 km from the finish, but was unable to break clear and finished fifth. One week later he was fourth at Paris–Roubaix, after his move on the cobbled sector of Auchy-lez-Orchies was counter-attacked by the eventual winner Peter Sagan at 54 km from Roubaix.

In May, he won the Tour of Yorkshire after an attack in the final stage to Leeds. He won the opening team time trial with his BMC team of the Tour de Suisse in June, before entering the Tour de France. Van Avermaet moved into the yellow jersey on the third day of the Tour after BMC won the team time trial in Cholet. He finished second, in the yellow jersey, in stage 9 to Roubaix, which included  of cobbled sectors. He managed to keep the maillot jaune for another day, after he went in the breakaway and finished fourth in the first mountain stage to Le Grand Bornand. He wore the yellow jersey for eight days and finished 28th in the general classification.

In August, Van Avermaet finished fourth in the Clásica de San Sebastián, 25th in the European road race championship in Glasgow and was sixth overall in the BinckBank Tour. Later in the season, he secured a second-place finish at the Grand Prix de Québec and third in the Grand Prix de Montréal, both times behind winner Michael Matthews. He ended the season at the World Road Race Championships in Innsbruck, Austria. He claimed the bronze medal with his BMC team at the team time trial event and finished 50th in the men's road race.

2019: CCC Pro Team
In 2019, BMC changed sponsorship following the death of team owner Andy Rihs. Poland-based shoe retailer CCC became the new title sponsor, leaving Van Avermaet as the prime anchor of the team. He started the season with a stage win and 21st place overall in the Tour of Valencia and 17th overall in the Tour of Oman, but failed to secure another win in his classics campaign. He finished second at Omloop Het Nieuwsblad behind Zdeněk Štybar, sixth in Strade Bianche, third in E3 Harelbeke and a disappointing tenth in the Tour of Flanders. On 15 September 2019 Van Avermaet won the Grand Prix Cycliste de Montréal for the second time in his career.

Doping allegations
In April 2015 the Royal Belgian Cycling League requested a two-year ban for Van Avermaet, the disqualification of all his results during the 2012 season and a €262,500 fine following an investigation into suspected anti-doping offences. It was reported in the Belgian media that their accusations focused on allegations of Van Avermaet's use of the corticoid Diprophos, and Vaminolact, a fortified baby food which is banned from being injected. On 7 May 2015, it was announced that Van Avermaet was cleared of all allegations.

Major results
Source:

2005
 8th Road race, UEC European Under-23 Road Championships
 8th Ronde van Vlaanderen U23
 9th Flèche Ardennaise
2006
 1st  Road race, National Under-23 Road Championships
 1st Internationale Wielertrofee Jong Maar Moedig
 1st Kattekoers
 2nd Paris–Tours Espoirs
 4th Grand Prix de Waregem
 8th Overall Le Triptyque des Monts et Châteaux
 8th Overall Giro delle Regioni
 9th Circuit de Wallonie
 9th Druivenkoers Overijse
2007
 1st Rund um die Hainleite
 1st Memorial Rik Van Steenbergen
 1st Stage 5 Tour of Qatar
 1st Stage 2 Tour de Wallonie
 3rd Ronde van het Groene Hart
 3rd GP Briek Schotte
 4th Grand Prix d'Isbergues
 4th Nokere Koerse
 5th Grand Prix of Aargau Canton
 5th Grote Prijs Gerrie Knetemann
 6th Overall Tour de Picardie
 6th Halle–Ingooigem
 8th Vattenfall Cyclassics
 9th Overall Tour of Belgium
2008
 Vuelta a España
1st  Points classification
1st Stage 9
 1st Stage 2 Tour de l'Ain
 2nd Overall Tour of Belgium
1st Stage 3
 2nd Overall Tour de Wallonie
1st Stage 3
 3rd Overall Tour of Qatar
 3rd E3 Prijs Vlaanderen
 4th Road race, National Road Championships
 7th Overall Tour de Picardie
 7th GP Ouest–France
 7th Grote Prijs Stad Zottegem
 8th Tour of Flanders
2009
 1st Heistse Pijl
 4th Road race, National Road Championships
 4th Omloop Het Nieuwsblad
 4th Halle–Ingooigem
 5th Overall Tour of Belgium
 5th Grand Prix d'Isbergues
 6th Grote Prijs Jef Scherens
 9th Grand Prix of Aargau Canton
2010
 3rd Halle–Ingooigem
 4th Road race, National Road Championships
 5th Road race, UCI Road World Championships
 7th Grote Prijs Stad Zottegem
 8th Brabantse Pijl
 9th Overall Tour de l'Ain
2011
 1st  Overall Tour de Wallonie
1st Stage 5
 1st Paris–Tours
 Tour of Austria
1st  Points classification
1st Stage 6
 2nd Overall Tour of Belgium
 2nd Gran Piemonte
 3rd Clásica de San Sebastián
 4th Halle–Ingooigem
 7th Liège–Bastogne–Liège
 7th Binche–Chimay–Binche
 9th Milan–San Remo
 9th Strade Bianche
2012
 2nd Grand Prix Cycliste de Québec
 2nd Grand Prix de Wallonie
 4th Tour of Flanders
 5th Omloop Het Nieuwsblad
 5th Strade Bianche
 5th Brabantse Pijl
 6th Paris–Tours
 8th Gran Piemonte
 9th Trofeo Deià
2013
 1st  Overall Tour de Wallonie
1st  Points classification
1st Stages 3 & 5
 1st Stage 1 Tour of Utah
 3rd Gent–Wevelgem
 3rd Grand Prix Cycliste de Québec
 3rd Binche–Chimay–Binche
 4th Paris–Roubaix
 4th Gullegem Koerse
 4th Grand Prix Cycliste de Montréal
 5th Omloop Het Nieuwsblad
 6th Overall Tour of Qatar
1st Stage 2 (TTT)
 6th Strade Bianche
 6th Brabantse Pijl
 6th Grand Prix of Aargau Canton
 7th Tour of Flanders
2014
 1st Grand Prix de Wallonie
 1st Grand Prix Impanis-Van Petegem
 2nd Omloop Het Nieuwsblad
 2nd Tour of Flanders
 4th Binche–Chimay–Binche
 5th Road race, UCI Road World Championships
 5th Overall Eneco Tour
1st Stage 5
 5th Grand Prix Cycliste de Québec
 7th Grand Prix Cycliste de Montréal
 8th Clásica de San Sebastián
 10th Overall Tour of Belgium
 10th E3 Harelbeke
2015
 1st  Overall Tour of Belgium
1st Stage 4
 Tour de France
1st Stages 9 (TTT) & 13
 1st Stage 3 Tirreno–Adriatico
 2nd Overall Eneco Tour
 2nd Strade Bianche
 3rd Road race, National Road Championships
 3rd Tour of Flanders
 3rd Paris–Roubaix
 3rd Paris–Tours
 5th Overall Tour of Qatar
 5th Amstel Gold Race
 5th Vattenfall Cyclassics
 6th Omloop Het Nieuwsblad
 7th Overall Tour de Yorkshire
 8th UCI World Tour
 10th Grand Prix Cycliste de Québec
2016
 1st  Road race, Olympic Games
 1st  Overall Tirreno–Adriatico
1st Stages 1 (TTT) & 6
 1st Grand Prix Cycliste de Montréal
 1st Omloop Het Nieuwsblad
 Tour de France
1st Stage 5
Held  after Stages 5–7
 1st Gullegem Koerse
 2nd Grand Prix Cycliste de Québec
 3rd Road race, National Road Championships
 3rd Overall Tour of Qatar
 4th Overall Eneco Tour
1st Stage 5 (TTT)
 4th Binche–Chimay–Binche
 5th Milan–San Remo
 5th Clásica de San Sebastián
 6th UCI World Tour
 6th Strade Bianche
 9th Gent–Wevelgem
 10th Road race, UCI Road World Championships
2017
 1st UCI World Tour
 1st  Overall Tour de Luxembourg
1st  Points classification
1st Stages 2 & 4
 1st Paris–Roubaix
 1st Gent–Wevelgem
 1st E3 Harelbeke
 1st Omloop Het Nieuwsblad
 1st Stage 1 (TTT) Tirreno–Adriatico
 1st Stage 1 (TTT) Volta a la Comunitat Valenciana
 2nd Tour of Flanders
 2nd Grand Prix Cycliste de Québec
 2nd Strade Bianche
 4th Overall BinckBank Tour
 6th Road race, UCI Road World Championships
 7th Kuurne–Brussels–Kuurne
 7th Grand Prix Cycliste de Montréal
 8th Clásica de San Sebastián
 10th Bretagne Classic
2018
 1st  Overall Tour de Yorkshire
1st  Points classification
 Tour de France
1st Stage 3 (TTT)
Held  after Stages 3–10
 Combativity award Stage 10
 1st Stage 3 Tour of Oman
 1st Stage 1 (TTT) Tirreno–Adriatico
 1st Stage 1 (TTT) Tour de Suisse
 1st Stage 3 (TTT) Volta a la Comunitat Valenciana
 2nd Grand Prix Cycliste de Québec
 3rd  Team time trial, UCI Road World Championships
 3rd E3 Harelbeke
 3rd Grand Prix Cycliste de Montréal
 4th Paris–Roubaix
 4th Clásica de San Sebastián
 5th UCI World Tour
 5th Tour of Flanders
 6th Overall BinckBank Tour
 8th Dwars door Vlaanderen
2019
 1st Grand Prix Cycliste de Montréal
 1st Stage 3 Volta a la Comunitat Valenciana
 2nd Overall Tour de Yorkshire
1st Stage 4
 2nd Clásica de San Sebastián
 2nd Omloop Het Nieuwsblad
 3rd E3 Binckbank Classic
 3rd Grand Prix Cycliste de Québec
 4th Overall BinckBank Tour
 6th Strade Bianche
 6th Bretagne Classic
 7th Primus Classic
 8th Road race, UCI Road World Championships
 10th Tour of Flanders
 Tour de France
Held  after Stages 1–2
 Combativity award Stage 18
2020
 2nd Overall Tour de Wallonie
 3rd Gran Trittico Lombardo
 8th Milan–San Remo
 8th Strade Bianche
2021
 3rd Tour of Flanders
 6th E3 Saxo Bank Classic
 7th Overall Étoile de Bessèges
 7th Dwars door Vlaanderen
 8th Kuurne–Brussels–Kuurne
 8th Paris–Camembert
  Combativity award Stage 6 Tour de France
2022
 3rd Overall Tour du Limousin
 3rd Omloop Het Nieuwsblad
 4th UCI Gravel World Championships
 4th Gullegem Koerse
 4th Binche–Chimay–Binche
 5th Overall Tour de Wallonie
 5th Tour du Finistère
 9th Circuit Franco-Belge

General classification results timeline

Classics results timeline

Major championship results timeline

Honours and awards

 Crystal Bicycle Best Professional Cyclist: 2004, 2005, 2006, 2012
 Flandrien of the Year: 2008, 2013, 2014, 2015, 2016, 2017
 Vlaamse Reus: 2016
 Belgian Sportsman of the Year: 2016
 Honorary Citizen of Dendermonde: 2016
 VeloNews: Classics Rider of the Year: 2017
 Swiss Mendrisio d'Or: 2017
 CyclingRanking – Overall ranking (26th place)

Notes

References

External links

  
 

Belgian male cyclists
1985 births
Living people
Belgian Vuelta a España stage winners
Olympic medalists in cycling
Cyclists at the 2012 Summer Olympics
Cyclists at the 2016 Summer Olympics
Cyclists at the 2020 Summer Olympics
Olympic gold medalists for Belgium
Olympic cyclists of Belgium
People from Lokeren
Belgian Tour de France stage winners
Cyclists from East Flanders
Medalists at the 2016 Summer Olympics
UCI World Tour winners